The CCHA Defenseman of the Year is an annual award given out after the conclusion of the Central Collegiate Hockey Association regular season to the best defenseman in the conference as voted by the coaches of each CCHA team. The conference previously awarded two separate individual awards, Best Defensive Defenseman and Best Offensive Defenseman, which were merged to form this solitary award.

Award winners

Winners by school

See also
CCHA Awards
Best Defensive Defenseman
Best Offensive Defenseman

References

General

Specific

External links

College ice hockey player of the year awards in the United States
Forward of the Year